Douglas R. Welton is an American politician from Utah. He currently serves as the representative for Utah House District 67. He is on the Higher Education Appropriations Subcommittee, House Government Operations Committee, and the House Public Utilities, Energy, and Technology Committee.

2022 sponsored legislation

References

Living people
Utah Republicans
People from Payson, Utah
Year of birth missing (living people)